Jana Marie Hupp (born April 2, 1964) is an American actress.

Born in Spokane, Washington, she studied at the North Carolina School of the Arts and the Western Washington University and worked on stage in theatre productions in Seattle. She later relocated to Los Angeles and in 1985 made her feature debut in Vision Quest. Her early television roles were on Scarecrow and Mrs King and My Sister Sam.

She had roles in Knots Landing, Brooklyn South and Public Morals. She appeared twice in Star Trek: The Next Generation, playing different characters. She appeared as Mindy Hunter-Farber in the TV sitcom Friends. She has also featured in the films Splash, Too, In the Line of Duty: Smoke Jumpers, The Devil Takes a Holiday and Independence Day. She is best known for her role on the NBC television program Ed as Nancy Burton, the friend of the protagonist, Ed Stevens.

Filmography

References

External links
 
 Jana Marie Hupp at Hollywood.com

1964 births
20th-century American actresses
21st-century American actresses
American film actresses
American television actresses
Living people
Actresses from Spokane, Washington
Western Washington University alumni